Žubrino is a village in the municipality of Kičevo, North Macedonia. It used to be part of the former municipality of Oslomej.

Demographics
As of the 2021 census, Žubrino had 203 residents with the following ethnic composition:
Albanians 198
Persons for whom data are taken from administrative sources 5

According to the 2002 census, the village had a total of 547 inhabitants. Ethnic groups in the village include:
Albanians – 306
Others – 3

References

External links

Villages in Kičevo Municipality
Albanian communities in North Macedonia